Sheldon-Williams Collegiate (SWC) is a high school for grades 9 through 12, located in the Lakeview neighbourhood of Regina, Saskatchewan, Canada.

A part of Regina Public Schools, Sheldon offers a variety of programs and extracurricular activities, including the VISA program, which integrates foreign and Canadian students. It is also well known for its fine arts program.

Its namesake, Catherine Sheldon-Williams, was an English immigrant and long-time school board member.

The school currently serves approximately 650 students. Its associate elementary schools are Argyle School, Connaught Community School, Davin School, Ethel Milliken School, Harbour Landing School, and Lakeview School.

Notable alumni or staff

 Tyler Bozak, NHL hockey player, 2019 Stanley Cup Champion
 Rob Britton, professional cyclist, Tour of Utah 1st overall 2017, Tour of the Gila 1st overall 2018
 Ben Heenan, former offensive lineman, Indianapolis Colts, Grey Cup Champion 2013 champion for the Saskatchewan Roughriders
 Colin James, musician
 Sarah Kramer, author of best-selling vegan cookbooks
 Jason Plumb, musician
 Jon Ryan, CFL punter with the Saskatchewan Roughriders, also Super Bowl XLVIII champion for the Seattle Seahawks
 Addison Richards, former CFL receiver with the Winnipeg Blue Bombers

Affiliated communities
Albert Park (pop. 11,450)
Cathedral (pop. 7085)
Lakeview (pop. 7600)

References

External links
Sheldon-Williams Collegiate

High schools in Regina, Saskatchewan
Educational institutions established in 1956
1956 establishments in Saskatchewan